The 2006 Arizona Wildcats softball team represented the University of Arizona in the 2006 NCAA Division I softball season.  The Wildcats were coached by Mike Candrea, who led his twenty-first season.  The Wildcats finished with a record of 54–11.  They played their home games at Rita Hillenbrand Memorial Stadium and competed in the Pacific-10 Conference, where they finished second with a 15–6 record.

The Wildcats were invited to the 2006 NCAA Division I softball tournament, where they won the Regional and Super Regional and then completed a run through the Women's College World Series to claim their seventh NCAA Women's College World Series Championship.

Roster

Schedule

References

Arizona
Arizona Wildcats softball seasons
Arizona Softball
Women's College World Series seasons
NCAA Division I softball tournament seasons